Baragaon is a census town in Varanasi district  in the state of Uttar Pradesh, India.

Geography
It has an average elevation of 88 metres (288 feet).

Demographics
 India census, Baragaon had a population of 10,517. Males constitute 53% of the population and females 47%. Baragaon has an average literacy rate of 56%, lower than the national average of 59.5%; with 65% of the males and 35% of females literate. 21% of the population is under 6 years of age.

Education 
Baragaon is considered as educational hub of nearby areas. Shri Baldeo Post Graduate College is preferred by most students of the area for higher studies. Baragaon is near to International airport varanasi.

About Town 
Baragaon is a medium scale town of Varanasi District about 15 km away, and 3 km from the international airport (Babatpur). Baragaon has its own history and identity. A 500 year old Sri Ram-Janki Temple is situated near a pond. Sharda Canal passes through the heart of the town, which provides ample water for the agricultural land.
The town has good medical facilities with a hospital by Dr. Awadhesh Singh dedicated to eye surgery specialization and another 100 years old Baldeo hospital by Dr S D Agarwal  in the old Bazar. The hospital provides health care to the surrounding towns and villages. The hospital been renovated recently and is equipped with all ultramodern facilities.

Major means of income for the people of town is from the weaving of Intricate Benarasi Sari on Silk, Carpet manufacturing.  Since 2015 a major bypass passes through the town that connects the town to Varanasi which has reduced the commute to 45 Minutes to the heart of Varanasi.
Several Schools and Colleges are also springing up, that provide courses in engineering and management to the younger generation. 
This town also has five national bank branches and several automated teller machines for financial services.
Baragaon panchayat kshetra consists many villages, and in which some are, Baragaon, Diha, Pachrasi, Baurahawan, Khushiyalipur, Bisaipur, Sitapur, Koiripur, Kusahi, Madanpur, Gangkala and Bhattha etc.

References

Cities and towns in Varanasi district